Polom may refer to places:

Bosnia and Herzegovina
Polom (Bratunac), a village in Bratunac, Bosnia and Herzegovina

Czech Republic
Polom (Přerov District), a municipality and village in the Olomouc Region
Polom (Rychnov nad Kněžnou District), a municipality and village in the Hradec Králové Region
Polom, a village and part of Bochov in the Karlovy Vary Region
Polom, a village and part of Sedloňov in the Hradec Králové Region
Polom, a village and part of Sulkovec in the Vysočina Region
Polom, a village and part of Trhová Kamenice in the Pardubice Region

Poland
Połom, Olecko County, a village in the administrative district of Gmina Świętajno
Połom, Szczytno County, a village in the administrative district of Gmina Świętajno

Serbia
Polom (Gornji Milanovac), a village in the municipality of Gornji Milanovac
Polom (Vladičin Han), a village in the municipality of Vladičin Han

Slovenia
Polom, Kočevje, a settlement in the Municipality of Kočevje